Craig Green may refer to:
 Craig Green (designer) (born 1986), English fashion designer
 Craig Green (rugby union) (born 1961), New Zealand rugby union player
 Craig Green (wrestler) (born 1964), Australian wrestler

See also
 Craig Greenhill (born 1972), Australian rugby league footballer
 Craig Greenwood (born 1963), New Zealand sailor